Forensic Files (1996–2011) is an American documentary-style series which reveal how forensic science is used to solve violent crimes, mysterious accidents, and even outbreaks of illness. The original show is broadcast in syndication on multiple networks, is narrated by Peter Thomas, and is produced by Medstar Television. It has broadcast 406 episodes since its debut on TLC in 1996 as Medical Detectives.

Series overview

Episodes

Season 1 (1996)

Season 2 (1997)

Season 3 (1998)

Season 4 (1999)

Season 5 (2000–2001)

Season 6 (2001)

Season 7 (2002–2003)

Season 8 (2003)

Season 9 (2004–2005)

Season 10 (2005–2006)

Season 11 (2006–2007)

Season 12 (2007–2008)

Season 13 (2008–2010)

Season 14 (2010–2011)

Specials 
Following the move of the show from TLC to CourtTV in 2000, TLC managed to produce four hour-long specials, "Payback", "The Buddhist Monk Murders", "Eight Men Out", and "See No Evil", but under the original Medical Detectives title. The first four specials do not feature narration by Peter Thomas due to a contract negotiation that wouldn't allow him to record episodes for TLC anymore. Instead, they were narrated by Peter Dean. Following their original broadcasts, three of these episodes did not air again until 2016, when they were broadcast on the HLN Network under the Forensic Files title. The last two specials, "JFK Assassination" and "The Lindbergh Baby Kidnapping" aired on CourtTV with Peter Thomas narrating under the title: Forensic Files Special.

Netflix collection

References

External links
 Forensic Files episodes on TV Guide

Episodes
Lists of American non-fiction television series episodes